Eastleigh College in Eastleigh, Hampshire is a further education college providing technical and professional training and apprenticeships to school leavers, in addition to part-time professional courses and part-time leisure courses for adults.

With over 9,000 apprentices in learning, the college was ranked the best in Hampshire for learner achievement (and within the top 10 FE and Sixth Form colleges nationally), and named the third largest college provider of adult apprenticeships in England.

In 2018 the college was criticised for sub-contracting much of its provision.

In 2018 a merger between Eastleigh College and Southampton City College was announced but fell through last minute.

Campus
The College has recently undergone a £12 million redevelopment project, which includes a new training kitchen and professional restaurant for Catering students; new facilities for Art, Design & Media; new training salons and a commercial Hair & Beauty Salon for Hair and Beauty students; and a new Advanced Technology Centre with facilities for Computer Science, Construction and Engineering.

Ofsted judgement

As of 2019, the college's most recent inspection was in 2018 and the judgement was Good.

References

Eastleigh
Further education colleges in Hampshire
Learning and Skills Beacons